Lahıc may refer to:
Lahıc, Goygol, Azerbaijan
Lahıc, Ismailli, Azerbaijan
Lahıc, Zaqatala, Azerbaijan